The Harbin Z-5 (Zhishengji – helicopter) is a Chinese variant of the Soviet Mil Mi-4 piston powered helicopter. Before its discontinuation from service, it was produced in Harbin, China. The USSR provided China with Mi-4 blueprints just a few years before the Sino-Soviet split in 1958. Maiden flight was in 1958 and mass production started in the mid-1960s. China has produced a number of unique variants through this model, and the Z-5 was employed by the PLA, PLAAF and PLANAF in large numbers as reserve forces. A total of 558 Z-5 were built. A few Z-5 helicopters were modified to carry machine-guns and rocket pods.

During the Chinese-Western rapprochement, one Z-5 was refitted with a Pratt & Whitney Canada PT6T-6 "Twin Pac" turbo-shaft engine in 1979. Some sources refer to this as the Z-6, but this variant was discontinued after its first model.

Variants

Z-5  Military transport helicopter.
Z-5 assault helicopter Some Z-5 were converted to carry rocket pods on outriggers in addition to a gondola with a forward firing machine gun manned by the flight engineer.
Z-5 Xuanfeng  Civil transport helicopter.
Z-5 VIP helicopterVIP versions distinguishable by larger rectangular windows in the cabin.
Z-5 agricultural helicopter Some Z-5s were fitted with chemical hoppers and/or spray gear for agricultural or forestry protection use.
Z-5 SAR helicopterThirteen z-5s are known to have been converted to SAR helicopters with a winch and external fuel tanks.
Harbin/CHDRI Z-6  A turboshaft variant of the Z-5, eleven aircraft built.

Operators

Albanian Air Force - all 40 retired

Korean People's Army Air Force 
 Khmer Rouge
National Army of Democratic Kampuchea Status unknown after 1990s.

People's Liberation Army Air Force
People's Liberation Army Ground Force
People's Liberation Navy

Specifications (Z-5)

See also

References

Bibliography
Bill Gunston, An Illustrated Guide to Military Helicopters, Salamander Books Ltd, London 1981. 

1950s Chinese military transport aircraft
China–Soviet Union relations
Military helicopters
1950s Chinese helicopters
Harbin aircraft
Aircraft first flown in 1958
Single-engined piston helicopters